Gorjane is a village in the municipality of Vrapčište, North Macedonia. It used to be part of Negotino-Pološko Municipality.

History
According to the 1467-68 Ottoman defter, Gorjane appears as being inhabited by an Albanian population. Due to Slavicisation, some families had a mixed Slav-Albanian anthroponomy - usually a Slavic first name and an Albanian last name or last names with Albanian patronyms and Slavic suffixes. 

The names are: Marko Arbanas; Lazor (herder), Grgur; Nikolla, his son; Petro, son of Boja.

Demographics
As of the 2021 census, Gorjane had 25 residents with the following ethnic composition:
Albanians 25

According to the 2002 census, the village had a total of 70 inhabitants. Ethnic groups in the village include:
Albanians 70

References

External links

Villages in Vrapčište Municipality
Albanian communities in North Macedonia